The 1935 U.S. National Championships (now known as the US Open) was a tennis tournament that took place on the outdoor grass courts at the West Side Tennis Club, Forest Hills in New York City, United States. The tournament ran from 29 August until 12 September. It was the 55th staging of the U.S. National Championships and the fourth Grand Slam tennis event of the year.

Finals

Men's singles

 Wilmer Allison defeated  Sidney Wood  6–2, 6–2, 6–3

Women's singles

 Helen Jacobs defeated  Sarah Palfrey Cooke 6–2, 6–4

Men's doubles
 Wilmer Allison /  John Van Ryn defeated  Don Budge /  Gene Mako 6–2, 6–3, 2–6, 3–6, 6–1

Women's doubles
 Helen Jacobs /  Sarah Palfrey Cooke defeated  Carolin Babcock /  Dorothy Andrus 6–4, 6–2

Mixed doubles
 Sarah Palfrey Cooke /  Enrique Maier defeated  Kay Stammers /  Roderich Menzel 6–4, 4–6, 6–3

References

External links
Official US Open website

 
U.S. National Championships
U.S. National Championships (tennis) by year
U.S. National Championships
U.S. National Championships
U.S. National Championships
U.S. National Championships